The 2011–12 Gold Coast United season was the Gold Coast United's third and final season in the A-League.

Season overview
On 23 September 2011, it was announced the club would start a youth academy consisting of 22 players who missed out on a place in the NYL squad. It has been speculated that the aim of this project is to address issues of community engagement.

On 19 February 2012, Miron Bleiberg was fired as manager, with Mike Mulvey taking over the following day.

Transfers

In

Released

Squad

Competitions

A-League

League table

Results summary

Results by matchday

Results

Squad statistics

Appearances and goals

|-
|colspan="14"|Players who left Gold Coast United during the season:
|}

Goal scorers

Disciplinary record

Notes

References

External links
Official website 

Gold Coast United FC seasons
G